Hillcrest Elementary School may refer to:

Canada
 Hillcrest Elementary School, located in Surrey, British Columbia that is part of the School District 36 Surrey

United States

 Alabama
 Hillcrest Elementary School, located in Enterprise, Alabama that is part of the Enterprise City Schools district

 Arkansas
 Hillcrest Elementary School, located in Lynn, Arkansas that is part of the Hillcrest School District

 California
Hillcrest Drive Elementary School, located in Los Angeles, California that is part of the Los Angeles Unified School District
 Hillcrest Elementary School, located in Monterey Park, California that is part of the Garvey School District)
 Hillcrest Elementary School, located in Oakland, California that is part of the Oakland Unified School District
 Hillcrest Elementary School, located in San Francisco, California that is part of the San Francisco Unified School District

 Colorado
 Hillcrest Elementary School, located in Northglenn, Colorado that is part of the Adams County School District 12 (commonly known as Adams 12 Five Star Schools)

 Florida
 Hillcrest Elementary School, located in Lake Wales, Florida that is part of the Polk County Public Schools district
 Hillcrest Elementary School, located in Orlando, Florida that is part of the Orange County Public Schools district

 Georgia
 Hillcrest Elementary School, located in Dublin City, Georgia that is part of the Dublin City School District
 Hillcrest Elementary School, located in LaGrange, Georgia that is part of the Troup County School District

 Idaho
 Hillcrest Elementary School, located in American Falls, Idaho that is part of the American Falls School District #381
 Hillcrest Elementary School, located in Boise, Idaho that is part of the Independent School District of Boise City (commonly known as the Boise School District)

 Illinois
 Hillcrest Elementary School, located in Antioch, Illinois that is part of the Antioch Community Consolidated School District 34
 Hillcrest Elementary School, located in Downers Grove, Illinois that is part of the Downers Grove Grade School District 58
 Hillcrest Elementary School, located in East Moline, Illinois that is part of the East Moline School District 37
 Hillcrest Elementary School, located in Elgin, Illinois that is part of the Elgin Area School District U46

 Kansas
 Hillcrest Elementary School, located in Lawrence, Kansas that is part of the Lawrence USD 497

 Louisiana
 Hillcrest Elementary School, located in Ruston, Louisiana that is part of the Lincoln Parish School District

 Maryland
 Hillcrest Elementary School, located in Catonsville, Maryland that is part of the Baltimore County Public Schools district
 Hillcrest Elementary School, located in Frederick, Maryland that is part of the Frederick County Public Schools district
 Hillcrest Heights Elementary School, located in Temple Hills, Maryland that is part of the Prince George's County Public Schools district

 Massachusetts
 Hillcrest Elementary School, located in Turners Falls, Massachusetts that is part of the Gill-Montague Regional School District

 Michigan
 Hillcrest Elementary School, located in Alma, Michigan that is part of the Alma Public Schools district
 Hillcrest Elementary School, located in Dearborn Heights, Michigan that is part of the Crestwood School District
 Hillcrest Elementary School, formerly located in Kalamazoo, Michigan before it closed in 1970

 Missouri
 Hillcrest Elementary School, located in Belton, Missouri that is part of the Belton School District
 Hillcrest School, located in Lebanon, Missouri that is part of the Lebanon R-III School District

 Montana
 Hillcrest Elementary School, located in Butte, Montana that is part of the Butte School District

 New Jersey
 Hillcrest School, located in Somerset, New Jersey that is part of the Franklin Township Public Schools district

 New York
 Hillcrest Elementary School, located in Peekskill, New York that is part of the Peekskill City School District

 North Carolina
 Hillcrest Elementary School, located in Burlington, North Carolina that is part of the Alamance-Burlington School System

 Ohio
 Hillcrest Elementary School, located in Richfield, Ohio that is part of the Revere Local School District

 Oklahoma
 Hillcrest Elementary School, located in El Reno, Oklahoma that is part of the El Reno Public Schools district
 Hillcrest Elementary School, located in Oklahoma City, Oklahoma that is part of the Oklahoma City Public Schools district

 Oregon
 Hillcrest Elementary School, located in North Bend, Oregon that is part of the North Bend School District

 Pennsylvania
 Hillcrest Elementary School, located in Drexel, Pennsylvania that is part of the Upper Darby School District
 Hillcrest Elementary School, located in Southampton, Pennsylvania that is part of the Council Rock School District
 Hillcrest Intermediate School, located in Huntingdon, Pennsylvania that is part of the Norwin School District

 South Dakota
 Hillcrest Elementary School, located in Brookings, South Dakota that is part of the Dakota Prairie School District

 Tennessee
 Hillcrest Elementary School, located in Chattanooga, Tennessee that is part of the Hamilton County Schools district
 Hillcrest Elementary School, located in Troy, Tennessee that is part of the Obion County Schools System

 Texas
 Hillcrest Elementary School, located in Austin, Texas that is part of the Del Valle Independent School District
 Hillcrest Elementary School, located in Plainview, Texas that is part of the Plainview Independent School District
 Hillcrest Elementary School, located in San Antonio, Texas that is part of the San Antonio Independent School District

 Utah
 Hillcrest Elementary School, located in Logan, Utah that is part of the Logan School District
 Hillcrest Elementary School, located in Ogden, Utah that is part of the Ogden City School District
 Hillcrest Elementary School, located in Orem, Utah that is part of the Alpine School District

 Washington
 Hillcrest Elementary School, located in Lake Stevens, Washington that is part of the Lake Stevens School District
 Hillcrest Elementary School, located in Oak Harbor, Washington that is part of the Oak Harbor School District

 Wisconsin
 Hillcrest Elementary School, located in Chippewa Falls, Wisconsin that is part of the Chippewa Falls Area School District
 Hillcrest Elementary School, located in Ellsworth, Wisconsin that is part of the Ellsworth Community School District
 Hillcrest Elementary School, located in Pulaski, Wisconsin that is part of the Pulaski Community School District
 Hillcrest Primary School, located in Shawano, Wisconsin that is part of the Shawano School District

 Wyoming
 Hillcrest Elementary School, located in Gillette, Wyoming that is part of the Campbell County Schools district